David Fischer may refer to:

David Hackett Fischer (born 1935), American historian
David C. Fischer, Special Assistant to President Ronald Reagan
David Fischer (ice hockey) (born 1988), American hockey player
David Fischer (weightlifter) (born 1998), Austrian-Bulgarian weightlifter
David J. Fischer, former mayor of St. Petersburg, Florida
David Joseph Fischer (1939–2016), American diplomat, United States Ambassador to Seychelles

See also
David Fisher (disambiguation)